Yerra Raghu, known professionally as Raghu Babu, is a Telugu comedian well known for his comic expressions and timing. He has worked in many successful films in Telugu industry. He is the eldest son of famous comedian and character actor Giri Babu. His native place is Ravinuthala. He got married in 1988. He played a crucial role in comedy part in movies, establishing himself as the director's pick in several Telugu films. He is a Nandi Award nominee for a Telugu film.

Filmography

 Dongalu Unnaru Jagratha (1990)
 Mondi Mogudu Penki Pellam (1992)
 Uzhiyan (1994; Tamil) as Subramani's henchman
 Murari (2001) as Erra Babu
 Neetho Cheppalani (2002)
 Aadi (2002)
 Bharata Simha Reddy (2002)
 Chennakesava Reddy (2002) as Venkat Reddy's son
 Gemeni (2002)
 Khadgam (2002)
 Anveshana (2002)
 Dhanush (2003)
 Kabaddi Kabaddi (2003)
 Golmaal (2003)
 Raghavendra (2003)
 Dil (2003)
 Kalyana Ramudu (2003) as Subbu
 Shambu (2003)
 Charminar (2003)
 Okato Number Kurradu (2003)
 Vishnu (2003)
 Toli Choopulone (2003)
 Ori Nee Prema Bangaram Kaanu (2003)
 Sreerama Chandrulu (2003)
 Nenu Seetamahalakshmi (2003)
 Maa Alludu Very Good (2003)
 Shiva Shankar (2004)
 Mr & Mrs Sailaja Krishnamurthy (2004)
 Varsham (2004) as Bhadranna's henchman
 Seenu Vasanthi Lakshmi (2004)
 Preminchukunnam Pelliki Randi (2004)
 Aithe Enti (2004)
 Andalu Dongale Dorikithe (2004) as Simhadri
 Yagnam (2004)
 Koduku (2004)
 Swamy (2004)
 Valliddaru Okkate (2004)
 Gowri (2004)
 Gudumba Shankar (2004)
 Apparao Driving School (2004)
 Chanti (2004)
 Suryam (2004)
 Seenu Vasanthi Lakshmi (2004)
 Leela Mahal Center (2004)
 Aa Naluguru (2004) as Messenger of God
 Sorry Naaku Pellaindi (2004) as Girisham
 Prayatnam (2005)
 Pellam Pichodu (2005) as Raghu
 Mr. Errababu (2005)
 22 Minutes (2005)
 Nuvvostanante Nenoddantana (2005) as Rao/Tempo Rao
 786 (Khaidi Premakatha) (2005)
 Arey (2005)
 Chakram (2005) as Conman
 Bunny (2005) as Somaraju's henchman
 Hungama (2005)
 Athanokkade (2005) as Abdullah
 Jagapati (2005)
 Kanchanamala Cable TV (2005)
 Please Naaku Pellaindi (2005)
 Adirindayya Chandram (2005)
 Nayakudu (2005)
 Political Rowdy (2005) as Dasu
 Allari Pidugu (2005)
 Modati Cinema (2005)
 Moguds Pellams (2005)
 Sri (2005)
 Shock (2006)
 Bangaram (2006) as Taxi Driver
 Kitakitalu (2006) as Lawyer
 Mayajalam (2006)
 Ashok (2006) as Anjali's brother
 Vikramarkudu (2006) as Bauji's brother-in-law
 Astram (2006) as Mirchi Malai's assistant
 Brahmastram (2006) as A.K. 47
 Photo (2006)
 Tata Birla Madhyalo Laila (2006) as Fraud Swamiji
 Game (2006) as Police Officer
 Chinnodu (2006)
 Aadhi Lakshmi (2006)
 Annavaram (2006)
 Sri Ramadasu (2006)
 Desamuduru (2007) as Hospital compounder
 Evadaithe Nakenti (2007) as Pentayya
 Lakshmi Kalyanam (2007)
 Adivaram Adavariki Sellavu Kavali (2007)
 Okkadunnadu (2007) as Marwadi
 Jagadam (2007) as Seenu's father
 Bhookailas (2007)
 Athili Sattibabu LKG (2007)
 Munna (2007) as Satti Pandu
 Sri Mahalakshmi (2007)
 Raju Bhai (2007)
 Dubai Seenu (2007) as Panjagutta Sub-Inspector
 Aa Roje (2007)
 Lakshyam (2007) as Shankar's henchman
 Police Story 2 (2007; Kannada)
 Satyabhama (2007)
 Allare Allari (2007) as Paidi Raju
 Yamadonga (2007) as Maheshwari's father-in-law's son
 Tulasi (2007)
 Bhajantrilu (2007)
 Seema Sastry (2007)
 Maisamma IPS (2007)
 Godava (2007)
 Mee Sreyobhilashi (2007) as Mallesh, Bus Driver
 Pourudu (2008) as Mastan
 Nee Sukhame Ne Korukunna (2008) as Swapna's Brother
 Andariki Vandanalu (2008)
 Krishnarjuna (2008)
 Ontari (2008)
 Lakshmi Putrudu (2008)
 Nagaram (2008) as Shankar Dada
 John Appa Rao 40 Plus (2008)
 Sawaal (2008)
 Donga Sachinollu (2008)
 Adhyakshaa (2008)
 Kantri (2008) as Acid Durga
 Hare Ram (2008)
 Gajibiji (2008)
 Souryam (2008) as Athidhi Sastry
 Friends Colony (2008)
 Chintakayala Ravi (2008) as Krishna Reddy
 Kuberulu (2008)
 Sasirekha Parinayam (2009) as Abbulu
 Konchem istam konchem kastam (2009)
 Mental Krishna (2009)
 A Aa E Ee (2009) as Bulabbayyi
 Masth (2009)
 Drona (2009)
 Adhinetha (2009)
 Kick (2009) as Don
 Rajavari Chepala Cheruvu (2009)
 Aa Okkadu (2009)
 Current (2009) as Guava seller
 Raju Maharaju (2009)
 Nachav Alludu (2009)
 Bendu Apparao R.M.P (2009) as Raju's servant
 Rechipo (2009) as Zimbabwe
 Jayeebhava (2009) as Tiger Paandu
 Katha (2009)
 Saleem (2009)
 Posani Gentleman (2009)
 Kasko (2009)
 Om Shanti (2010)
 Adhurs (2010) as Meetha
 Namo Venkatesa (2010) as Srinivas
 Bindaas (2010) as Raghu
 Kalavar King (2010)
 Aakasa Ramanna (2010) as Swamiji
 Yagam (2010)
 Taj Mahal (2010)
 Betting Bangaraju (2010)
 Buridi (2010)
 Vedam (2010) as Dappu Subani
 Panchakshari (2010)
 Jhummandi Naadam (2010)
 Brahmalokam To Yamalokam Via Bhulokam (2010) as Shankar Jackson
 Kothi Muka (2010)
 Don Seenu (2010) as Tambaraju
 Khaleja (2010) as Sundaram
 Brindavanam (2010) as Bhoomi's uncle
 Baava (2010)
 Kalyanram Kathi (2010) as Auto Driver Baasha
 Alasyam Amrutham (2010) as Railway Police Officer
 Ragada (2010) as Hotel Server
 Ranga The Donga (2010)
 Kathi Kantha Rao (2010) as Rao Gopal Sharma
 Bhale Mogudu Bhale Pellam (2011)
 Oosaravelli (2011) as Shiva
 Wanted (2011)
 Vareva (2011)
 Katha Screenplay Darsakatvam Appalaraju (2011) as Rakhi
 Mr. Perfect (2011) as Dubey's brother-in-law
 Maaro (2011)
 Mayagadu (2011)
 Manchivaadu (2011)
 Madatha Kaja (2011) as Puli
 Veedu Theda (2011) as Yugandhar
 Poola Rangadu (2012) as Thalapathy (Lala Goud's Assistant)
 Denikaina Ready (2012)
 Endhukante... Premanta! (2012)
 Daruvu (2012) as Pavitrananda Swamiji
 Damarukam (2012) as Goke Ring Raju
 Krishnam Vande Jagadgurum (2012) as Veeraraju
 Yamudiki Mogudu (2012) as Silk Dada
 Naa Ishtam (2012) as Ganga
 Ramachari - Eedo Pedda Goodachari (2013) as The Lunatic Man
 Ongole Gittha (2013) as Dorababu's relative
 Naayak (2013) as Babji's henchman
 Mirchi (2013) as Deva's aide
 Gunde Jaari Gallanthayyinde (2013)
Jaffa (2013) as Father Suyodhana
 Tadakha (2013) as Hanumanthu
 Balupu (2013) as Nanaji's henchman
 Doosukeltha (2013) as Swamiji
 Potugadu (2013)
 Attarintiki Daredi (2013) as Murthy
 Bhai (2013) as Bhavani's henchman
 Mantra 2 (2013)
 Race Gurram (2014) as Bank Robber
 Alludu Seenu (2014) as Nayudu/Lungi Baba
 Aagadu (2014) as Firangi
 Loukyam (2014) as Leela
 Jump Jilani (2014) as Dharmaraju
 Govindudu Andarivadele (2014)
 Rough (2014)
 Sri Vasavi Kanyaka Parameswari Charitra (2014) as Muthyalu
 Gaddam Gang (2015)
 Rey (2015)
 Pandaga Chesko (2015) as Raghupathi
 Kick 2 (2015) as Balwanth Singh Thakur
 Raju Gari Gadhi (2015) as Chekodi
 Shankarabaranam (2015)
 Soukhyam (2015) as Deva
 Keechaka (2015) as Idli seller
 O Malli (2016) as Ramulayya
 Dictator (2016) as Vasthu Bheeshmacharya
 Supreme (2016) as Bellam Sridevi's father
 Sardaar Gabbar Singh (2016) as Govinda
 A Aa (2016) as Raghu, Lata's affair
 Thikka (2016) as Narasimha
 Jaguar (2016) as Raghu
 Meelo Evaru Koteeswarudu (2016)
 Khaidi No. 150 (2017) as Chef
 Nenu Local (2017) as Siddharth's father
 Winner (2017) as Dharmendra Reddy's P.A.
 Guru (2017) as Soomulu
 Mister (2017) as Vodka Prasad
 Rarandoi Veduka Chudham (2017) as Bhaskar
 Patel S. I. R. (2017) as Minister
 Nakshatram (2017)
 Mahanubhavudu (2017)
 Oye Ninne (2017)
 Raja the Great (2017) as SI Babu Rao
 Balakrishnudu (2017) as Peddha Paleru
 Agnyaathavaasi (2018) as Koteswara Rao
 Chalo (2018) as Principal Paramathma
 Juvva (2018)
 Raa Raa (2018)
 Nela Ticket (2018) as Aditya's assistant
 Jamba Lakidi Pamba (2018)
 Saakshyam (2018) as Siva Prasad's assistant
 Sailaja Reddy Alludu (2018)
 Amar Akbar Anthony (2018) as Gandikota
 F2: Fun and Frustration (2019) as MLA Anji Reddy
 Chikati Gadilo Chithakotudu (2019)
 Chanakya (2019) as Bank Manager
 Sye Raa Narasimha Reddy (2019) as Raghavachari
 Tenali Ramakrishna BA. BL (2019) as Durga Rao
 Bhagyanagara Veedullo Gamattu (2019)
 Venky Mama (2019) as Advocate Happy Hanumantha Rao
 Sarileru Neekevvaru (2020) as Teacher Tirupati Rao
 Disco Raja (2020) as Giri
 Jaanu (2020) as Watchman Kapala Devudu
 Bheeshma (2020) as Balram
 Eureka as College Chairman
 Anukunnadi Okkati Ayyandhi Okati (2020)
 Zombie Reddy (2021)
 A1 Express (2021)
 Gaali Sampath (2021)
 Mosagallu (2021)
 Kaadan/Aranya (2021)
 Ee Kathalo Pathralu Klalpitham (2021)
 Sridevi Soda Center (2021)
 Pelli SandaD (2021)
 Induvadana (2022)
 Son of India (2022)
 Bheemla Nayak (2022) as Balaji
 Acharya (2022)
 Ghani (2022)
 F3 (2022)
 Ammu (2022)
 Ginna (2022)
 Itlu Maredumilli Prajaneekam (2022)
 Dhamaka (2022)
 18 Pages (2022)
 Waltair Veerayya (2023)
 Bhola Shankar (2023)

Television
 Vasantha Kokila (serial)
 Muttaiduva (DD serial)
 Lady Detective (serial)
 Antharangalu   (Etv Serial)

References

External links
 

Living people
Telugu male actors
Telugu comedians
1964 births
Male actors in Telugu cinema
Male actors from Andhra Pradesh
People from Prakasam district
Indian male film actors
21st-century Indian male actors
20th-century Indian male actors
Indian male comedians